Ratilal Kalidas Varma (born 30 June 1948) is a member of the 14th Lok Sabha of India. He represents the Dhandhuka constituency of Gujarat and is a member of the Bharatiya Janata Party.He was the tallest MP of India.
Ratilal Varma also served as National Vice President of Schedule Caste Cell, BJP

External links
 Official biographical sketch in Parliament of India website

People from Ahmedabad district
Bharatiya Janata Party politicians from Gujarat
1948 births
Living people
India MPs 2004–2009
Lok Sabha members from Gujarat
India MPs 1989–1991
India MPs 1991–1996
India MPs 1996–1997
India MPs 1998–1999
India MPs 1999–2004